Walid Mesloub (born 4 September 1985) is an Algerian professional footballer who plays as a forward .

Career
Born in Trappes, France, Mesloub joined Le Havre AC on 9 January 2010, on a -year contract.
After four-and-a-half years in Le Havre, Mesloub joined Ligue 1 side FC Lorient in June 2014, signing a three-years contract.

International career
On 25 October 2010, Abdelhak Benchikha, manager of the Algerian National Team, traveled to France to supervise Mesloub in the league game between Le Havre and Nîmes. Subsequently, on 30 October 2010, he was called up to Algeria's friendly against Luxembourg.

References

External links
 
 
 

1985 births
Living people
People from Trappes
Footballers from Yvelines
Association football forwards
Algerian footballers
Algerian expatriate footballers
Algeria international footballers
French footballers
French sportspeople of Algerian descent
Ligue 1 players
Ligue 2 players
Championnat National players
Championnat National 2 players
Qatar Stars League players
FC Istres players
Le Havre AC players
FC Lorient players
Levallois SC players
FC Versailles 78 players
RC Lens players
Umm Salal SC players
Expatriate footballers in Qatar
Algerian expatriate sportspeople in Qatar